Ch-Ch-Changes may refer to:

 "Ch-Ch-Changes" (CSI), a fifth-season episode of CSI: Crime Scene Investigation
 "Ch-Ch-Changes", a first-season episode of Popular
 "Ch-Ch-Changes", a third-season episode of Roswell
 "Ch-Ch-Changes", a second-season episode of Perception

See also 

 "Changes", the David Bowie song in which the phrase appears